Norman Smith (born February 1947), was an American politician who was a member of the Oregon House of Representatives. He is a former musician and member of the band Mr. Lucky & The Gamblers.

References

1947 births
Living people
Republican Party members of the Oregon House of Representatives
Politicians from Tigard, Oregon
Musicians from Portland, Oregon
Politicians from Roseburg, Oregon